The 1998 European Weightlifting Championships were held in Riesa, Germany in April 1998. It was the 77th edition of the European Weightlifting Championships. There were a total number of 144 competing athletes from 29 nations.

Medal overview

Men

Women

References
Results (sports123)
ewf

E
Weightlifting
European Weightlifting Championships
International weightlifting competitions hosted by Germany